Wilcze Bagno  is a village in the administrative district of Gmina Sztabin, within Augustów County, Podlaskie Voivodeship, in north-eastern Poland. The name literally translates as "wolves' swamp".

References

Wilcze Bagno